Manu Chao is a French-Spanish singer and guitarist. This is a list of official releases by Chao as a solo artist with his backing band Radio Bemba Sound System.

Studio albums

Live albums

Singles

As lead artist

As featured artist

Notes

References

Discographies of Spanish artists
Discographies of French artists
Latin music discographies